Alphaville, São Paulo is an affluent district split between the municipalities of Barueri and Santana de Parnaíba suburbs of São Paulo. The Alphaville concept is a real estate and gated community development in Brazil, constituted by a number of business and residential condominia. The name evokes the "first among cities" concept (ville as French for city and alpha being the first letter of Greek alphabet). The concept has been widely copied in Brazil and abroad.

History
The Alphaville concept was created by a building company in São Paulo City, Albuquerque & Takaoka, in the 1970s. The São Paulo megalopolis was beginning to show an upward trend in crime rates, traffic jams, and other forms of urban malaise. Consequently, suburban developments gained popularity, both for modern industrial and commercial ventures, and for wealthy and upper-middle class nouveau riche. The company bought large farm areas in the neighboring counties of Barueri and Santana do Parnaíba and urbanized them. The then-recently built Castelo Branco Highway provided a fast and easy access to downtown São Paulo. The lots were sold initially for commercial and industrial development, but soon demand for lots for residential purposes arose. The residential lots to gated luxury horizontal condominia (for building family houses) were swiftly sold out.

Characteristics

Presently, the original Alphaville site (23 km from São Paulo) has 33 gated areas, with more than 20,000 residences. The business area is a small city, with 2,300 businesses, including 11 schools and universities, with a daily movement of more than 150,000 people. Due to the high traffic to and from São Paulo city (most of the residents work or study there), the Castelo Branco Highway has been expanded and is now a toll road, with a tolled spur road specifically for Alphaville.  

When a new residential condominium is developed, the company does all the basic civil works for supporting the construction on the lots, such as electrical, telephone and data communications cabling, hydraulic (water and sewer) mains and treatment facilities, landscaping and gardening, lighting and paving of internal avenues and streets, perimeter walling and security fencing, supporting buildings for security, services, etc. In most of the developments, a social and sports club for the residents is also built, with soccer, golf and tennis fields, jogging and bicycle treks, sauna, swimming pools, ballrooms, restaurants and bars, etc.

Beginning in the 1990s, the company now renamed Alphaville Urbanismo, expanded its developments to several other cities in Brazil, such as Aracaju, Brasília, Campinas, São José dos Campos, Ribeirão Preto, Rio de Janeiro, Goiânia, Curitiba, Londrina, Maringá, Salvador, Fortaleza, Belo Horizonte, Natal, Gramado, Manaus, and others, as well as to Portugal (in Cascais). Many of these developments, such as that of Campinas, are also large (1,200 residences, in this case) and have an adjoining business district, with a shopping mall, a hotel, schools, etc.

Other variations of real estate developments by the same company followed, such as Aldeia da Serra, Toque-Toque Pequeno (a beach resort condominium) and Villa Alpha and Alphaville Residential, which provide pre-built modular houses to buyers.

References

 Caldeira, Teresa Pires do Rio. City of Walls : Crime, Segregation, and Citizenship in São Paulo. Dissertation for the degree of Doctor of Philosophy in Anthropology in the Graduate Division of the University of California at Berkeley, 1992, p. 257.
 Gotsch, Peter. "NeoTowns – Prototypes of corporate Urbanism." Dissertation for the degree of Doctor of Engineering at the Karlsruhe Institute of Technology, 2009, Chapter 3: Alphaville-Tamboré – The accidental new Town, pp337, http://www.neo-town.org (r06.03.2012)

External links
  Alphaville Urbanismo Home Page
  Encontra Alphaville - Find everything about Alphaville neighborhood
 CityMayors feature

Companies based in São Paulo (state)
Real estate and property developers